The 2016 Engie Open de Biarritz Pays Basque was a professional tennis tournament played on outdoor clay courts. It was the 14th edition of the tournament and part of the 2016 ITF Women's Circuit, offering a total of $100,000 in prize money. It took place in Biarritz, France, on 12–18 September 2016.

Singles main draw entrants

Seeds 

 1 Rankings as of 29 August 2016.

Other entrants 
The following player received a wildcard into the singles main draw:
  Sara Cakarevic
  Chloé Paquet
  Jessika Ponchet
  Harmony Tan

The following players received entry from the qualifying draw:
  Varvara Flink
  Beatriz Haddad Maia
  Jasmine Paolini
  Martina Trevisan

The following player received entry by a protected ranking:
  Claire Feuerstein

Champions

Singles

 Rebecca Šramková def.  Martina Trevisan, 6–3, 4–6, 6–1

Doubles

 Irina Khromacheva /  Maryna Zanevska def.  Cornelia Lister /  Nina Stojanović, 4–6, 7–5, [10–8]

External links 
 2016 Engie Open de Biarritz at ITFtennis.com
 Official website 

2016 ITF Women's Circuit
2016 in French tennis
Open de Biarritz